Sandyford is a small district in central Newcastle upon Tyne. It represents the north-eastern border of central Newcastle, with the suburbs of Jesmond to the north and Heaton to the east.

Population
Similarly to neighbouring Jesmond, Sandyford is home to a large number of students because of its close proximity to Newcastle University and Northumbria University.

Architecture
Sandyford's housing stock is mostly red brick Victorian terraced housing, and many of these are Tyneside flats. Towards the south-east, the residential streets run steeply downwards to Jesmond Dene.

In the south of Sandyford, there are some light industrial business buildings, including offices and small warehouses.

Transport
Sandyford is serviced by the Tyne and Wear Metro, with the nearest station being Jesmond Metro station.

References

Districts of Newcastle upon Tyne